The Midlothian campaign of 1878–80 was a series of foreign policy speeches given by William Gladstone, leader of Britain's Liberal Party. It is often cited as the first modern political campaign. It also set the stage for Gladstone's comeback as a politician. It takes its name from the Midlothian constituency in Scotland where Gladstone (who was of Scottish ancestry) successfully stood in the 1880 election.

When Prime Minister Benjamin Disraeli attempted to distract public opinion from the economic and financial problems of Britain by calling attention to the worsening British-Ottoman relations, Gladstone in four speeches charged the government with financial incompetence, neglect of domestic legislation, and mismanagement of foreign affairs.

The Midlothian campaign unified the Liberal Party under Gladstone's leadership and probably forced the government to think in terms of dissolution sooner. It created a momentum that carried the Liberals to power in the election.

Background
In 1876, news of a series of atrocities by the Ottomans during their suppression of the Bulgarian April Uprising reached the British press, despite the strong censorship of the Turkish authorities. British public reaction was generally one of dismay, fuelled by the public prints, but the government of Benjamin Disraeli continued its policy of support for the Ottoman Empire, an ally in the Crimean War and a bulwark against possible Russian expansion in the area.

Gladstone took up the issue slowly, at first appearing uninterested. By 1878 he was publishing articles in favour of ending British economic support for the Ottoman government in response.

The campaign
By 1880, Gladstone's dogged focus on the issue had dragged it to the forefront of public attention, and in the general election of 1880, Gladstone toured a series of cities giving speeches of up to five hours on the subject. The nature of his orations has often been compared to that of sermons, and his fiery, emotive, but logically structured speeches are credited with swaying a large number of undecided voters to the Liberals in the 1880s, and ousting Disraeli's last Conservative government.

Equally important to the large scale of attendance at these meetings (several thousand came to each, and given the relatively narrow scale of the franchise, this meant Gladstone could address a large proportion of electors in each district) was the widespread reporting of Gladstone's speeches and the public reaction to them. Paul Brighton argues that it was a highly successful media event:
What was new about Midlothian was not that Gladstone spoke from the platform. This was already common-place for many front-rank politicians. It was the fact that the campaign was effectively designed as a media event, with specific attention to the deadlines and operational requirements of the journalists covering it and crafted for maximum impact in the morning and evening papers.

Content
Gladstone's speeches covered the entire range of national policy, he gave his large audiences an advanced course in the principles of government that was both magisterial and exciting. The major speeches constitute a statement of the Liberal philosophy of government, reinforced by the fervour of his own deeply-held Anglican faith. Scotland, at this time, was a nation fixated on the promotion this sort of religious and moral rectitude and probity. His focus was usually on foreign affairs. Gladstone presented his commitment to a world community, governed by law, protecting the weak. His vision of the ideal world order combined universalism and inclusiveness; he appealed to group feeling, the sense of concern for others, rising eventually to the larger picture of the unity of mankind.

See also
 Tulchan
American election campaigns in the 19th century, for contemporary campaigns

References

Further reading

 Blair, Kirstie. "The People’s William and the People’s Poets: William Gladstone and the Midlothian Campaign." The People’s Voice (2018) online.
 Brooks, David. "Gladstone and Midlothian: The Background to the First Campaign," Scottish Historical Review (1985) 64#1 pp 42–67. online
 Brown, Stewart J. “‘Echoes of Midlothian’: Scottish Liberalism and the South African War, 1899-1902.” Scottish Historical Review 71#191/192, (1992), pp. 156–83, online.
 Fitzsimons, M. A. "Midlothian: the Triumph and Frustration of the British Liberal Party," Review of Politics (1960) 22#2 pp 187–201. in JSTOR
 Jenkins, Roy. Gladstone (1997) pp 399–415
 Kelley, Robert. "Midlothian: A Study In Politics and Ideas," Victorian Studies (1960) 4#2 pp 119–140. online
 Matthew, H. C. G Gladstone: 1809-1898 (1997) pp 293–313
 Whitehead, Cameron Ean Alfred. "The Bulgarian Horrors: culture and the international history of the Great Eastern Crisis, 1876-1878" (PhD. Dissertation, University of British Columbia, 2014) online
 Yildizeli, Fahriye Begum. "W.E. Gladstone and British Policy Towards the Ottoman Empire." (PhD dissertation, University of Exeter, 2016) online.

Primary sources
 Gladstone, W.E. Midlothian Speeches. 1879 (Leicester University Press, 1971).
 Gladstone, William E. Midlothian Speeches 1884 with an Introduction by M. R. D. Foot, (New York: Humanities Press, 1971) online

External links
Time Traveller's Guide to Victorian Britain: Midlothian campaign

Political campaigns in the United Kingdom
History of Midlothian
19th century in the United Kingdom
William Ewart Gladstone
1870s speeches
1880s speeches